Rachela Fiszel (fl.1496 – fl.1519), was a Polish banker. She was the Court Jew of the King of Poland from 1496 until 1519 after her spouse Mojżesz. She was also the banker of Aleksander Jagiellończyk, Kazimierz Jagiellończyk, Jan Olbracht and Zygmunt Stary.

References

 Maurycy Horn: Fiszel (Fiszlowa) Rachela (Raszka). W: Polski słownik judaistyczny. Dzieje – kultura – religia – ludzie. Oprac. Zofia Borzymińska i Rafał Żebrowski. T. 1: A–K. Warszawa: Prószyński i S-ka, 2003, s. 432, seria: Słowniki. . [dostęp 2018-05-11].

15th-century Jews
15th-century Polish people
15th-century businesspeople
16th-century Polish businesspeople
16th-century businesswomen
Court Jews
Medieval Polish Jews
Medieval Jewish women
Medieval bankers
Women bankers
Medieval businesswomen